Bernardo T. Chua is from the Philippines and has worked for years in multi-level marketing.  He worked as an executive with Gano Excel first in the Philippines.  After three years he helped expand Gano Excel to Hong Kong and Canada and then to the United States.  Chua moved to California and became president of Gano Excel U.S.A.  Gano Excel marketed products with ganoderma in them.  These products included capsules, instant coffee and other food products.

Problems arose with Gano Excel's products.  In April 2004, the U.S. Food and Drug Administration sent Chua a warning letter concerning various claims made about its products and ganoderma itself.  The FDA took exception to the company's claims that its products helped detect hidden diseases, helped remove excess cholesterol and removed toxins from the body.  Further, the FDA objected to the  "Testimony" section of Gano Excel's website as promoting "Gano Excel for the treatment of gout, diabetes, and psoriasis."

In February 2005, Gano Excel issued a recall and allergy alert concerning some of its products.  This resulted after Health Canada, the government health agency of Canada, conducted tests revealing the presence of milk protein, which was not declared on the product label.

In 2008, Bernardo Chua founded ORGANO GOLD™, which comprises a group of companies operating under trading names of Organo Gold  and Coffee Connoisseur.  His vision was to sell a range of healthy bioactive coffee products containing Ganoderma lucidum  from the lingzhi mushroom, promoted and sold through an established multi-level marketing distribution network on a wholesale basis, which are then offered to consumers for a suggested retail price.

In 2015, The Company decided to rebrand itself as ORGANO continuing to sell a wide range of consumables through its wide network of independent distributors.

References

American businesspeople